James Clemens High School is a public high school in Madison, Alabama, United States. The school is a part of Madison City Schools. The school is named after James Clemens,  the founder of Madison, Alabama. James Clemens was the second high school to be built in Madison, a necessary endeavor to serve the rapid growth of the community.  The city was rezoned for two high schools with Liberty Middle School feeding into James Clemens.

Scheduling

James Clemens High School operates on a four-block semesterial schedule and offers options such as dual enrollment and cooperative education (co-op) programs for those who qualify. School hours run from 8:12 a.m. to 3:28 p.m., Monday through Friday. Each class is 96 minutes long, with a four-minute class change period.

James Clemens offers a 1-hour "refuel block" during lunch where students may eat, socialize, convene with teachers or attend club meetings.

Clubs and organizations
James Clemens offers over 70 clubs and organizations, many of them service based, such as Interact Club and Junior Civitan, providing funds and services for the surrounding community.

James Clemens High School maintains an active music program including a marching band, two concert bands, jazz band, and a choir. The marching band consists of over 150 students and competes in 2 or more marching band competitions annually, both in state and out of state, and has received superior ratings in every competition since its creation, winning best in class and grand champion awards on several occasions.  The marching band performed in the New Years Day Parade in London, England on January 1, 2017.  The school's single choir, dubbed the "JC Jet Choir" is made up of approximately 80 students and hosts a Christmas concert and Spring concert annually. The group competes biennially in Festival Disney at the Walt Disney World Resort in Orlando, Florida. The music program as a whole has boasted relative success since the school's establishment.  The choir has received numerous awards for their performances in competition including an invitation to perform at Carnegie Hall in New York City, New York in the spring of 2018. The concert bands consistently receive awards for their performances as well.

James Clemens High School is home to the JROTC Jet Battalion, with over 100 cadets enrolled. The program instructors are/were Colonel Courtney Taylor (2012-2016) and Sergeant Major Samuel McCray (2013–present). The Jet Battalion's Color Guard presents The Colors at every home football game, basketball game, and soccer game. The Jet Battalion also cleans the Madison City Schools Stadium after every home game. As of 2015, the Battalion is rebuilding a Grumman F-9 Cougar to display on campus. The Jet Battalion's Color Guard, PT, and Drill Team compete in local meets, and have won several awards, one of which being the "HOOAH Award", received at the annual JROTC Day hosted by Redstone Arsenal.

Athletics

James Clemens provides students with the opportunity to compete in many of the major high school sports.

Notable alumni
 Monty Rice, linebacker for the Tennessee Titans
 Logan Stenberg, offensive guard for the Detroit Lions.

References

External links
Official school homepage
Student website

Public high schools in Alabama
Schools in Madison County, Alabama